Kenner Products is a defunct American toy company now part of Hasbro.

Kenner may also refer to:

 Kenner (film), a 1969 film featuring Prem Nath and Jim Brown
 Kenner (surname)
 Kenner, Illinois, USA
 Kenner, Louisiana, USA
 Kenner Collegiate Vocational Institute, Peterborough, Ontario, Canada
 Kenner Garrard (1827–1879), brigadier general in the Union Army during the American Civil War

See also

 
 Kennar (disambiguation)